John Henry "Tiger" Godfrey (August 13, 1921 – September 14, 2008) was an American football player and coach. He served as the head football coach at Whittier College in Whittier, California from 1960 to 1979, compiling a record of 118–68–6.

A native of Tacoma, Washington, Godfrey played college football at the State College of Washington—now known as Washington State University—Was a guard. He first lettered in 1942 during Babe Hollingbery's final year as head coach of the Washington State Cougars. Godfrey served as an infantryman in the United States Army during World War II, in New Guinea, the Philippines, and Japan. He returned to Washington State after the war and played two more seasons for the Cougars under head coach Phil Sarboe. Godfrey was co-captain of the 1947 Washington State Cougars football team and played in the Hula Bowl in 1948.

Godfrey began his coaching career in 1948 as an assistant football coach at the Punahou School in Honolulu. After two years as line coach at Punahou under head coach Fritz Minuth, Godfrey was appointed head football coach at Honolulu's Farrington High School. Godfrey spent 1951 on active military service duty and resumed coaching in 1952 as head football coach at Punahou. Godfrey returned to the Washington in 1954 as head football coach at Bellingham High School in Bellingham. He moved on to Whittier in 1957 and served as an assistant football coach under Don Coryell for three seasons before succeeding him as head coach in 1960.

Godfrey died on September 14, 2008, in Tualatin, Oregon, from complications of Parkinson's disease.

Head coaching record

College football

References

1921 births
2008 deaths
American football guards
Washington State Cougars football players
Whittier Poets athletic directors
Whittier Poets football coaches
College track and field coaches in the United States
High school football coaches in Hawaii
High school football coaches in Washington (state)
Whittier College faculty
United States Army personnel of World War II
People from Port Angeles, Washington
Coaches of American football from Washington (state)
Players of American football from Tacoma, Washington
Deaths from Parkinson's disease
Neurological disease deaths in Oregon